John McLaughlin (born 29 October 1954) is an English former professional footballer who played as a right back.

Career
Born in Edmonton, made 440 appearances in the Football League for Colchester United, Swindon Town and Portsmouth, scoring 11 goals.

He later played non-League football for Fareham Town.

Honours

Club
Portsmouth
 Football League Third Division Winner (1): 1982–83

References

External links
Post War English & Scottish Football League A - Z Player's Transfer Database

1954 births
Living people
English footballers
Association football fullbacks
Colchester United F.C. players
Swindon Town F.C. players
Portsmouth F.C. players
Fareham Town F.C. players
English Football League players